In mathematics, if  is a subset of  then the inclusion map (also inclusion function, insertion, or canonical injection) is the function  that sends each element  of  to  treated as an element of 

A "hooked arrow" is sometimes used in place of the function arrow above to denote an inclusion map; thus:

(However, some authors use this hooked arrow for any embedding.)

This and other analogous injective functions from substructures are sometimes called natural injections.

Applications of inclusion maps
Inclusion maps tend to be homomorphisms of algebraic structures; thus, such inclusion maps are embeddings.  More precisely, given a substructure closed under some operations, the inclusion map will be an embedding for tautological reasons. For example, for some binary operation  to require that

is simply to say that  is consistently computed in the sub-structure and the large structure. The case of a unary operation is similar; but one should also look at nullary operations, which pick out a constant element. Here the point is that closure means such constants must already be given in the substructure.

Inclusion maps are seen in algebraic topology where if  is a strong deformation retract of  the inclusion map yields an isomorphism between all homotopy groups (that is, it is a homotopy equivalence).

Inclusion maps in geometry come in different kinds: for example embeddings of submanifolds. Contravariant objects (which is to say, objects that have pullbacks; these are called covariant in an older and unrelated terminology) such as differential forms restrict to submanifolds, giving a mapping in the other direction. Another example, more sophisticated, is that of affine schemes, for which the inclusions

and

See also

References

Basic concepts in set theory
Functions and mappings